Rockfish Creek is a  long 5th order tributary to the Cape Fear River in Cumberland County, North Carolina.

Course
Rockfish Creek rises about 2 miles northeast of Aberdeen, North Carolina in Moore County.  The creek then flows southeast to Hoke County and Fort Bragg and then east into Cumberland County to join the Cape Fear River about 3 miles southeast of Fayetteville.

Watershed
Rockfish Creek drains  of area, receives about 47.8 in/year of precipitation, has a wetness index of 495.45 and is about 30% forested.

See also
List of rivers of North Carolina

References

Rivers of North Carolina
Rivers of Cumberland County, North Carolina
Protected areas of Hoke County, North Carolina
Rivers of Moore County, North Carolina
Tributaries of the Cape Fear River